The S23 is a regional railway line of the Zürich S-Bahn that operates only during rush hour.

Route 
 

The service calls only at major stations between Zürich (canton of Zürich) and Romanshorn (Canton of Thurgau) on the shores of Lake Constance. Only some trains operate between Winterthur and Romanshorn, while others have Winterthur as their terminus.

 Zürich Hauptbahnhof

Scheduling 
The S23 operates during peak-hours only: five trains from Winterthur to Zürich HB in the morning (two originate in Romanshorn), and four trains from Zürich HB to Winterthur in the evenings (with two continuing to Romanshorn). The journey between Zürich and Winterthur, including the sole intermediate stop in Stadelhofen, requires 24 minutes. Zürich to Romanshorn requires 69 minutes.

Rolling stock 
Services are operated by two (head and tail) refurbished Re 420 (LION) locomotives pushing or pulling double-deck passenger carriages.

History 
The S23 was introduced in the timetable revision of December 2015 as a peak-hour service between Zürich HB and Winterthur. Some S23 services continued to Romanshorn.

At the time of its introduction the S23 was the only service on the Zürich S-Bahn whose carriages were not air-conditioned, leading to complaints from passengers during the summer months.

See also 

 Rail transport in Switzerland
 Trams in Zürich

References 

Zürich S-Bahn lines
Transport in the canton of Zürich